Mount Deleon is a mainly ice-free mountain,  high, located along the south side of Entrikin Glacier,  west-northwest of Cape Douglas. It was named by the Advisory Committee on Antarctic Names for Emilio A. Deleon, a hauling equipment operator, U.S. Navy, and a member of the Byrd Station party, 1963.

References

Mountains of Oates Land